
De Nederlanden is a restaurant and hotel located in Vreeland in the Netherlands. It is a fine dining restaurant that was awarded one Michelin star in the years 1958 and 1959 and one or two Michelin stars in the period 1999 to present. GaultMillau awarded the restaurant 17.0 out of 20 points.

It was one of the founders of the Alliance Gastronomique Néerlandaise in 1967. In 2011 the restaurant was not a member. De Nederlanden is a member of the Chaîne des Rôtisseurs.

Head chefs
Incomplete overview of head chefs:
 1996–2002: Jan de Wit 
 2002–2007: Eric de Boer
 2007–present: Wilco Berends

Star history
 Period 1
 1958–1959: one star

 Period 2
 1999: one star
 2000–2002: two stars
 2003–present: one star

See also
List of Michelin starred restaurants in the Netherlands

Sources and references 

Restaurants in the Netherlands
Michelin Guide starred restaurants in the Netherlands
Restaurants in Stichtse Vecht